Acuclavella shoshone is a species of harvestman in the family Ischryopsalididae. It is found in North America.

References

Harvestmen